Fabio De Luigi (born 11 October 1967) is an Italian actor, voice actor, comedian, film director, television presenter, and former basketball player.

Biography
Great-grandson of Tonino Guerra; has a son, Dino, born in 2007, and a daughter, Lola, born in 2011, had by his partner Jelena.

Selected filmography
Marriages (1998)
All the Moron's Men (1999)
Johnny the Partisan (2000)
Commediasexi (2006)
Natale a New York (2006)
Natale in crociera (2007)
As God Commands (2008)
Natale a Rio (2008)
Many Kisses Later (2009)
The Friends at the Margherita Cafe (2009)
Men vs. Women (2010)
Women vs. Men (2011)
The Worst Week of My Life (2011)
Love Is in the Air (2012)
The Worst Christmas of My Life (2012)
Wannabe Widowed (2013)
A Woman as a Friend (2014)
Soap Opera (2015)
Si accettano miracoli (2015)
Tiramisù (2016)
Questione di karma (2017)
Put Grandma in the Freezer (2018)
When Mom Is Away (2019)
When Mom Is Away... With the Family (2020)

Discography
 2002 - Olmo & Friends.

External links
 

1967 births
Living people
Italian baseball players
Italian male film actors
Italian male singers
Italian male voice actors
Italian impressionists (entertainers)